Karen Meagher, formerly Karen Lloyd, is an actress born in Rock Ferry, Birkenhead in Cheshire. Her family are originally from North Wales and what is now the Merseyside area.

Her first acting role was playing a skivvy in the 1979 television series The Mallens. This was followed by a role playing teacher Miss Broom in the BBC 1980s children's programme Jonny Briggs.

She also played a young Lou Beale in the EastEnders special CivvyStreet, a spin-off that was filmed in 1988 but set in 1942.

Meagher is perhaps best known in Britain for the role of Ruth Beckett in the 1984 BBC nuclear war drama Threads. At the time she was a member of the Campaign for Nuclear Disarmament and was passionately committed to making a statement about the dangers of nuclear war in the United Kingdom. She also later appeared in a film outlining the risks attached to nuclear power; Chernobyl: The Final Warning.

Since then she has had many television and film roles including playing Inspector Murchison in Heartbeat, Grace Poole in the 2006 BBC adaptation of Wide Sargasso Sea, as well as smaller roles in Dalziel and Pascoe, Carrie's War, Down to Earth, Doctors, The Bill, Bad Girls, Silent Witness and Father Brown.

She appeared in the 2007 run of Equus in London's Gielgud Theatre, portraying the nurse and was also understudy for Jenny Agutter and Gabrielle Reidy's roles.

References

External links

English stage actresses
English television actresses
Living people
Year of birth missing (living people)